Finderne or Manville–Finderne was a New Jersey Transit railroad station on the Raritan Valley Line, in the Finderne section of Bridgewater Township, New Jersey. Located along Finderne Avenue (Somerset County Route 533), the station contained only a platform and old station tracks.

The station, which once housed a small building between the tracks, had been without facilities for some time prior to its closure. The last train to serve Finderne was the 4:18 p.m. train to Newark Penn Station on October 27, 2006. In its last years the station had only three trains stopping on weekdays (one morning train from Newark Penn Station and two afternoon trains to Newark Penn Station) and none on weekends.

See also 
List of New Jersey Transit stations

References 

Bridgewater Township, New Jersey
Former NJ Transit stations
Railway stations closed in 2006
Former Central Railroad of New Jersey stations
Former railway stations in New Jersey